Release Some Tension is  the third studio album by American R&B vocal group SWV. It was released by RCA Records on July 29, 1997. The album guest appearances by E-40, Puff Daddy, Missy Elliott, Timbaland, Foxy Brown, Lil' Cease, Lil' Kim, Snoop Dogg and Redman. 
The album was certified gold by the Recording Industry Association of America (RIAA) for shipments exceeding 500,000 copies in the United States.

The album features hits like "Rain", "Someone", and "Can We". Another single "Lose My Cool" was slated to be released as the album's third single but due to limited radio airplay it was shelved in favor of "Rain" which became one of their most notable hits. The second single "Someone" reached number 19 on the Billboard charts and was certified gold by the RIAA for sales of 500,000 copies.
The girls and others claimed that this album was rushed and recording began while they were still promoting their second album New Beginning (1996).

Critical reception

AllMusic senior editor Stephen Thomas Erlewine found that "with their third album, SWV attempt to break away from the slick urban straitjacket and return to their hip-hop roots. In order to achieve their goal, the group hired a head-spinning array of producers and collaborators [...] Considering all the extra starpower, it's not all that surprising that SWV occasionally become overwhelmed by their guests, but that doesn't prevent Release Some Tension from being a solid album, particularly when it's propelled by funky singles [...]."

Track listing

Charts

Weekly charts

Year-end charts

Certifications

References

External links 
 

1997 albums
SWV albums
Albums produced by Sean Combs
Albums produced by Timbaland
Pop albums by American artists